Inspector Ian Rutledge is a fictional character in the Inspector Ian Rutledge Series of mystery/detective novels by Caroline and Charles Todd. To date the series comprises twenty-four novels and four short stories. The series revolves around the cases of Inspector Ian Rutledge, a veteran of the First World War who has returned to the police force (Scotland Yard) as a detective, but is battling with post-traumatic stress disorder. As a consequence he is haunted by the memory of a fellow soldier who is a constant voice in his head. He must hide this information from those around him in order to avoid the social stigma which accompanied psychological, mental, or emotional issues in the early 20th century.

History of Ian Rutledge
Following the court martial of Corporal Hamish Macleod for failure to follow orders in the field, Macleod's commanding officer, Ian Rutledge, is forced to execute Macleod. Rutledge is then unexpectedly buried alive with the man's corpse when an artillery shell explodes in the camp. After being rescued, Rutledge discovers that it was an air pocket created by Hamish's corpse which kept him (and no one else) alive underground.  He must live with his guilt, which is now personified by Hamish's consistent voice living in his head. The existence of Hamish's voice is a secret Rutledge must keep from everyone, especially his jealous Scotland Yard superior who wants to see him removed, all while solving murders. When Rutledge returns from the Western front in 1919 he is treated in a hospital for his various symptoms only to be left by his fiancée, Jean.

Books

References

External links 
 

Fictional British police detectives